is a Japanese former judoka who competed in the 1976 Summer Olympics.

References

1951 births
Living people
Japanese male judoka
Olympic judoka of Japan
Olympic silver medalists for Japan
Olympic medalists in judo
Medalists at the 1976 Summer Olympics
Judoka at the 1976 Summer Olympics
20th-century Japanese people
21st-century Japanese people